Deuli is a village  and a gram panchayat within the jurisdiction of the Jibantala police station in the Canning II CD block in the Canning subdivision of the South 24 Parganas district in the Indian state of West Bengal.

Geography

Area overview
Canning subdivision has a very low level of urbanization. Only 12.37% of the population lives in the urban areas and 87.63% lives in the rural areas. There are 8 census towns in the Canning I CD block and only 2 in the rest of the subdivision. The entire district is situated in the Ganges Delta with numerous islands in the southern part of the region. The area (shown in the map alongside) borders on the Sundarbans National Park and a major portion of it is a part of the Sundarbans settlements. It is a flat low-lying area in the South Bidyadhari plains. The Matla River is prominent and there are many streams and water channels locally known as khals. A comparatively recent country-wide development is the guarding of the coastal areas with a special coastal force.

Note: The map alongside presents some of the notable locations in the subdivision. All places marked in the map are linked in the larger full screen map.

Location
Deuli is located at

Demographics
According to the 2011 Census of India, Deuli had a total population of 2,753 of which 1,409 (51%) were males and 1,344 (49%) were females. There were  360 persons in the age range of 0 to 6 years. The total number of literate persons in Deuli was 2,123 (88.72% of the population over 6 years).

Civic administration

CD block HQ
The headquarters of the Canning II CD block are located at Deuli.

Transport
Deuli is on the Deuli-Ghatakpukur Road.

Healthcare
Matherdighi Rural Hospital, with 30 beds, at Matherdighi, is the major government medical facility in the Canning II CD block.

References

Villages in South 24 Parganas district